Lanzmann is a surname. Notable people with the surname include:

 Claude Lanzmann (1925–2018), French filmmaker
 Jacques Lanzmann (1927–2006), French writer, scriptwriter, and lyric writer

See also
 Landsman
 Landmann
 Landesmann